Elections to Liverpool Town Council were held on Thursday 1 November 1866. One third of the council seats were up for election, the term of office of each councillor being three years.

Twelve of the sixteen wards were uncontested.

After the election, the composition of the council was:

Election result

Because twelve of the sixteen seats were uncontested seats, these statistics should be taken in that context.

Ward results

* - Retiring Councillor seeking re-election

Abercromby

Castle Street

Everton

Exchange

Great George

Lime Street

North Toxteth

Pitt Street

Rodney Street

St. Anne Street

St. Paul's

St. Peter's

Scotland

South Toxteth

Vauxhall

West Derby

By-elections

No. 6, Castle Street, 1 November 1866 - 2 seats

Caused by the retirements of Councillors John Cheshyre Blythe (Conservative, elected for the Castle 
Street ward on 1 November 1864) and Thomas Chilton (Liberal, elected 1 November 1865).

No. 10, Rodney Street, 1 November 1866

Caused by the retirement of Councillor C. J. English (Liberal, Rodney Street, elected 1 November 1865)

No. 13, St. Anne Street, 1 January 1867

Caused by the resignation of Councillor Joseph Bennion (Conservative, elected 1 November 1865)

See also

 Liverpool City Council
 Liverpool Town Council elections 1835 - 1879
 Liverpool City Council elections 1880–present
 Mayors and Lord Mayors of Liverpool 1207 to present
 History of local government in England

References

1866
1866 English local elections
November 1866 events
1860s in Liverpool